Ilawod is a 2017 Filipino independent supernatural horror film, directed by Dan Villegas in his first venture into the horror genre as a director with a script from Palanca winner Yvette Tan. It stars Iza Calzado, Ian Veneracion, Xyriel Manabat, Harvey Bautista, and Therese Malvar. The film depicts the story of a family's breakdown in the midst of a demonic attack.

The film, distributed by Quantum Films, was released on January 18, 2017.

Plot 
Dennis (Ian Veneracion), a news website reporter, accidentally brings a spirit home with him from a recent assignment. The spirit, Ilawod, manifests itself in different ways to different family members. It makes Dennis short-tempered and taste bitterness in hot drinks. It makes his wife Kathy (Iza Calzado) feel warm, and increases her sexual desires. Ilawod also manifest itself to his daughter Bea (Xyriel Manabat), and the older child, Ben (Harvey Bautista) and wreaks havoc on Dennis’ family who fights against it to save, not just their lives, but also their souls.

Cast 
 Ian Veneracion as Dennis 
 Iza Calzado as Kathy
 Harvey Bautista as Ben
 Xyriel Manabat as Bea
 Therese Malvar
 Epy Quizon

See also 
 List of ghost films

References 

Philippine independent films
Philippine ghost films
Philippine supernatural horror films